Julapalle or Julapalli or Julapally is a village Julapalli mandal of Peddapalli district in the state of Telangana in India.

References 

Villages in Peddapalli district